The men's marathon event at the 2014 Asian Games was held on 3 October on the streets of Incheon, South Korea with the finish at the Incheon Asiad Main Stadium. Hasan Mahboob won the gold medal for Bahrain.

Schedule
All times are Korea Standard Time (UTC+09:00)

Records

Results 
Legend
DNF — Did not finish

References

Final results

Marathon men
2014 men
2014 Asian Games
Asian
2014 Asian Games